Lorraine Burt (born 1961), is a female former swimmer who competed for England.

Swimming career
Burt became National champion in 1983 when she won the 1983 ASA National Championship title in the 100 metres breaststroke.

She represented England in the 100 metres breaststroke event, at the 1986 Commonwealth Games in Edinburgh, Scotland. She swam for Reading Swimming Club.

References

1961 births
English female swimmers
Swimmers at the 1986 Commonwealth Games
Living people
Commonwealth Games competitors for England
20th-century English women